Valery Vladimirovich Androsov (born February 12, 1939, Buy, Russian SFSR) is a Russian painter and architect, and director of the Mytishchi Art Gallery.

Biography
Androsov was born in the town of Buy in the Kostroma region. He was graduated from Penza Art College in 1961 and the  Moscow Higher School of Industrial Art in 1969. For many years, he worked as a senior artist and industrial designer in Mytishchi in the Moscow region, at the Mosstroyplasmass plant. Androsov headed the Department of Aesthetics and led a team of artists of various specialties, such as ornamentationists, interior designers, landscape designers, and photographers. He has created numerous designs for public and industrial interior spaces. He teaches interior design and layout at the Archimedes Children's School of Architecture and Art.

Interior design
Androsov contributed to the interior design of the District Youth Palace, and designed many other interior spaces, which demonstrate his mastery of modern materials and which have retained ergonomic and aesthetic appeal over the decades.

Monuments
Androsov has had a major impact on the memorial architecture of the city of Mytishchi. He designed the Mytishchi monument to the Great Patriotic War, along with O. Kiryukhin who created the sculptures. This is one of the major monuments in the city of Mytishchi. Another significant project was his Monument to the Airplane Po-2, dedicated to the graduates of the Mytischinskogo Aeroclub, for which he designed the architectural elements. The opening of this monument in September 2008 was a significant event in the cultural life of the city of Mytishchi, and the monument is one of the city's dominant architectural works. Androsov has won prizes for various monument projects, including Died in the Regional Wars.

Painting
As a painter, Androsov works in the genres of landscape and still life. His work has been displayed at various municipal exhibitions.

Positions, awards, and works
From 1998 to 2009, Androsov was chairman of the Association of Artists of Mytischi and the Mytischinskogo District. He was made director of the Mytishchi Art Gallery in 2003. The gallery opened to the public in 2007, with Androsov having created the interior design, three-dimensional composition, and lighting design.

Androsov has written numerous articles in the local newspaper Springs and the newspaper Art of the Peoples of the World, and dozens of articles about other artists and their works.

For his conscientious and long-term work Androsov has been repeatedly awarded honorary diplomas by the head of the Mytischinskogo municipal district and Council of Deputies. He was awarded the Medal "Veteran of Labour" and the Medal "In Commemoration of the 850th Anniversary of Moscow".

Androsov is a member of the International Federation of Artists and the Union of Russian Artists.

References

External links
ЮБИЛЕЙНАЯ ВЫСТАВКА В.В.АНДРОСОВА

1939 births
Living people
People from Buy, Kostroma Oblast
20th-century Russian painters
Russian male painters
21st-century Russian painters
Russian architects
20th-century Russian male artists
21st-century Russian male artists